Louise V. Wain is a British genetic epidemiologist currently serving as the British Lung Foundation Chair in Respiratory Research at the University of Leicester. Her research considers idiopathic pulmonary fibrosis and chronic obstructive pulmonary disease. During the COVID-19 pandemic, Wain studied the long-term impacts of COVID-19.

Early life and education 

Wain was an undergraduate student at the University of Manchester, where she studied micro- and molecular biology. She remained there for her graduate studies, where she earned a bachelor's degree in bioinformatics. Wain earned her doctoral degree at the University of Nottingham, where she studied RNA viruses. In 2007, after earning her doctorate, Wain moved to the University of Leicester as a postdoctoral research fellow.

Research and career 
Wain studies how genetic variations impact a patient's risk of developing respiratory disease. Her research makes use of UK Biobank data to better understand the genetic determinants of blood pressure. Small changes in blood pressure can considerably impact a person's likelihood of developing stroke or cardiovascular disease, and Wain hopes that better understanding the genetics can identify what predicts response to antihypertensive drugs. In 2017 Wain was awarded a  British Lung Foundation Chair in Respiratory Research at the University of Leicester.

Wain has studied the genetic differences associated with developing chronic lung disease. In a study of over 400,000 people Wain identified over 100 genetic differences that were likely to increase someone's risk of developing chronic obstructive pulmonary disease.

She has also investigated what puts people at risk of developing idiopathic pulmonary fibrosis (IPF), identifying three genes associated with suffering from IPF). Typically, people who are diagnosed with IPF die three years after diagnosis and there is no cure. In particular, Wain believes that targeting the AKAP13 biological pathway might lead to new treatments for IPF.

During the COVID-19 pandemic Wain studied the long-term effects of the mild form of COVID-19. Between 10 and 20% of users of the COVID Symptom Study application endured symptoms for longer than the average two week period. In July 2020 Wain was awarded £8.4 million to study the health outcomes of patients who were hospitalised with COVID-19 and went on to have long-term impacts on their health.

Select publications

References

External links
 Louise Wain at University of Leicester

Living people
Year of birth missing (living people)
COVID-19 researchers
Alumni of the University of Manchester
Alumni of the University of Leicester